Ned's Declassified School Survival Guide (sometimes shortened to Ned's Declassified) is an American live action sitcom on Nickelodeon that debuted on the Nickelodeon Sunday night TEENick scheduling block on September 12, 2004. The series' original pilot episode aired on September 7, 2003, without many of the current version's main characters, and it was ordered to series by Nickelodeon in early 2004. The one-hour special movie series finale aired on June 8, 2007.

The show was produced by Apollo ProScreen GmbH & Co. Filmproduktion KG in association with Jack Mackie Pictures. Its main executive producer and creator is Scott Fellows, the head writer for The Fairly OddParents.

Premise
Ned's Declassified School Survival Guide follows the lives of Ned Bigby, Jennifer "Moze" Mosely, and Simon "Cookie" Nelson-Cook. The first season takes place during the first semester of seventh grade, the second season covers the second semester of seventh grade, and the third season takes place during eighth grade. Throughout the series, Ned builds up a number of 'tips' for his "survival guide", and uses the tips to help himself and his classmates cope with the standard struggles of middle school. Each individual episode relates to a topic in the guide, such as popularity, grades, or sports, as well as developing other plots (such as Ned's love life) throughout.

Episodes

Cast

 Devon Werkheiser as Ned Bigby
 Lindsey Shaw as Jennifer "Moze" Mosely
 Daniel Curtis Lee as Simon "Cookie" Nelson-Cook
 Jim J. Bullock as Mr. Monroe (main role, season 1; recurring role, seasons 2–3)
 Daran Norris as Gordy (recurring role, season 1; main role, seasons 2–3)

Locations
The show takes place at the fictional James K. Polk Middle School, named after the 11th President of the United States, James K. Polk. The exterior of the school was filmed at La Mesa Junior High in Santa Clarita, California. The school's colors are gold and green and its mascot is the Wolves, which is a common theme throughout the school's interior.

During the first season, all of the show's action took place within the school or its grounds, and with the exception of one or two notable occasions, everything happened indoors. However, during season 2, the show's producers decided they wanted more exterior scenes, so more outdoor shots were used, and on certain occasions, the show took place off school property. The show's finale, for example, took place almost entirely off the school grounds.

DVD releases
In the USA there have been four DVD releases made for the series.
 TEENick Picks, Volume 1 released on April 18, 2006 – features "Guide to: Computer Labs and Backpacks" (Season 1, Episode 9)
 Special Field Trip Edition released on August 28, 2007 – features "Field Trips, Permission Slips, Signs, and Weasels" and "Guide to: Dismissal and The School Play."
 The Best of Season 1 and The Best of Season 2 both released on September 23, 2008 exclusive to Amazon.com.

The first season of Ned's Declassified School Survival Guide was released on DVD in the Netherlands, Australia, and Belgium on April 9, 2009. The Netherlands also released the second season, although both seasons were only released with Dutch dubbing. It's unknown if there will follow more places in Europe, or someplace else.

Alliance Home Entertainment has released the first two seasons on DVD in Canada only. The third and final season was supposed to be released on February 7, 2012 in Canada only, but again the production was delayed.

Reception

Ratings
The debut of Ned's Declassified School Survival Guide on September 12, 2004, received a 4.5 rating, with 914,000 tween viewers, which was described as "healthy, but not as stellar" ratings by Varietys Denise Martin.

Critical
Robert Lloyd of Los Angeles Times upon reviewing the series finale of Ned's Declassified School Survival Guide remarked that it was "one of the best series on television — a show that took genre conventions and ran them through unpredictable changes".

Proposed spin-off
In June 2008, Werkheiser signed a development contract with Nickelodeon for a spin-off that would deal with his character's adventures in high school. The show was never greenlit to production, due to the other major actors from the original series being busy with their own projects – creator and executive producer Scott Fellows was working on another Nickelodeon show, Big Time Rush; Daniel Curtis Lee was committed to Disney XD's Zeke and Luther; and Lindsey Shaw was working as the lead on ABC Family's 10 Things I Hate About You.

References

External links

  (Archived)
 

2000s American teen sitcoms
2000s Nickelodeon original programming
2004 American television series debuts
2007 American television series endings
English-language television shows
Middle school television series
Single-camera television sitcoms
Television series created by Scott Fellows